Jim Callis (born October 15, 1967) is a baseball writer who currently covers the MLB Draft and prospects for MLB Pipeline and MLB.com. He was formerly the executive editor of the Durham, North Carolina-based magazine Baseball America and its website BaseballAmerica.com, where his contributions included weekly updates to their website and major contributions to their signature publications, The Baseball America Almanac and The Baseball America Prospect Handbook.

Education
Callis grew up in Northern Virginia, mainly in Oakton. He attended the University of Georgia, where he covered the baseball team for the school paper. He graduated in 1988 with a degree in journalism.

Career
Callis began working for Baseball America directly out of college in 1988. In 1997 he moved to Chicago to go work for STATS, Inc. In 2000, Callis was lured back to Baseball America. Callis remains in the Chicago area, where he works as Baseball Americas executive editor.

Work with ESPN
Callis moderated a weekly Baseball America themed online chat on the sports website Espn.com. His chats on ESPN were always concluded by his signature lightning round, where he answered a high number of questions in a rapid fire style. Jim would frequently follow up his answers given during the lightning round in his weekly "Ask BA Column" on the Baseballamerica.com website.

In addition to providing baseball themed information during his chats, Callis often shared his views on popular culture topics, including Madden NFL video games, television shows such as 24, and actresses Jessica Alba and Anne Hathaway.

Television work 
Callis was a major contributor of ESPN's television coverage of the 2008 MLB Draft, along with Keith Law, Peter Gammons, Steve Phillips, Chris Singleton, and Karl Ravech.

References

External links

1967 births
Living people
American sportswriters
People from Falls Church, Virginia
People from Oakton, Virginia